Uday or Odai is a masculine name in Arabic as well as several Indian languages. In many Indian languages it means 'dawn' or 'rise'. The Arabic name means 'runner' or 'rising'.

List of people
 Uday Benegal, Indian musician
 Uday Pratap Singh, Indian titular of Bhadri state.
 Uday Chopra, Bollywood actor
 Odai Eid, Syrian footballer
 Uday Hussein, son of Saddam Hussein
 Sheikh Adi ibn Musafir, medieval Yazidi saint
 Oday Jafal, Syrian footballer
 Uday Kiran, Indian film actor
 Uday Kotak, Indian businessman
 Uday Merchant, Indian cricketer
 Ouday Raad, Lebanese actor and voice actor
 Oday Rasheed, Iraqi film director 
 Uday Pratap Singh, Indian politician
 Odai Al-Saify, Jordanian footballer
 Uday Shankar, Indian choreographer
 Udai Singh, Indian royalty
 Uday Singh, Indian politician
 Uday Singh (Fiji politician), Indo-Fijian politician
 Uday Singh Taunque, Sikh warrior
 Oday Taleb, Iraqi footballer

See also
 Euday L. Bowman, American composer
 Uday (river), Ukraine
 Uday Foundation, a non-profit organization based in New Delhi
 Ujwal DISCOM Assurance Yojana, a Government of India scheme

References

Arabic masculine given names
Indian masculine given names